How Poets Are Enjoying Their Lives is a 1988 Czechoslovak comedy film directed by Dušan Klein and written by Klein with Ladislav Pecháček. The third installment in the "Poets hexalogy", the title is preceded by How the World Is Losing Poets (1982) and How Poets Are Losing Their Illusions (1985), and followed by Konec básníků v Čechách (1993), Jak básníci neztrácejí naději (2004), and Jak básníci čekají na zázrak (2016). The film stars Pavel Kříž and David Matásek, and revisits the lives of Štěpán Šafránek and his best friend, Kendy, as they navigate their respective personal and professional lives.

Synopsis
After successfully completing his medical studies, Štěpán Šafránek joins the internal ward of the district hospital as a doctor. FAMU graduate Kendy obtains the position of assistant director at Czechoslovak Television and is filming a series in his hometown of Hradiště. After having problems with the chief physician at his hospital, Štěpán is transferred to the position of district doctor in Bezdíkov, where he meets his new love—music teacher Alena Hubáčková. The couple eventually moves to the north of the country.

Cast and characters

 Pavel Kříž as Štěpán Šafránek
 David Matásek as Kendy
 Eva Vejmělková as Alena
 Jana Hlaváčová as Tonička
 Rudolf Hrušínský as Hubáček
 Míla Myslíková as Štepán's mother
 Josef Dielle as Numira "Mireček"
 Eva Jeníčková as Vendulka "Utěšitelka"
 Karel Roden as Honza Antoš

 Václav Svoboda as Venoš Pastyřík
 Tomáš Töpfer as Dr. Sahulák
 Pavel Zedníček as Písařík
 Blažena Holišová as Hubáčková
 Rostislav Kuba as Teacher Hájek
 Věra Vlčková as Chief physician, nicknamed Obočenka
 František Filipovský as Adolf Valerián
 Josef Somr as Prof. Ječmen
 Ondřej Vetchý as Karabec

References

External links
 

1988 films
Czechoslovak comedy films
Czech comedy films
1988 comedy films
Czech sequel films
1980s Czech-language films
1980s Czech films